Ihtimillet or Ihtaimlat, also spelled Ihtaymilat, Ahtaymalat or Hetemlat, is a town in northern Aleppo Governorate, northwestern Syria. Nearby localities include Sawran  to the west and Dabiq  to the south. In the 2004 census, Ihtaimlat had a population of 6,764.

References

Populated places in Azaz District